Tracy is an unincorporated community and census-designated place (CDP) in Cascade County, Montana, United States. It is in the east-central part of the county, in the valley of Sand Coulee Creek, a north-flowing tributary of the Missouri River.

Tracy was first listed as a CDP prior to the 2020 census.

Demographics

References 

Census-designated places in Cascade County, Montana
Census-designated places in Montana